Judge Kennedy may refer to:

Anthony Kennedy (born 1936), judge of the United States Court of Appeals for the Ninth Circuit, before being elevated to the United States Supreme Court
Cornelia Groefsema Kennedy (1923–2014), judge of the United States Court of Appeals for the Sixth Circuit
Harold Maurice Kennedy (1895–1971), judge of the United States District Court for the Eastern District of New York
Henry H. Kennedy Jr. (born 1948), judge of the United States District Court for the District of Columbia
Thomas Blake Kennedy (1874–1957), judge of the United States District Court for the District of Wyoming

See also
Justice Kennedy (disambiguation)